Henry James Price (October 17, 1919 – December 21, 1989) was a Canadian politician, who represented St. David in the Legislative Assembly of Ontario from 1955 to 1971 as a Progressive Conservative member.

Background
He was born in Owen Sound, Ontario. In 1949, he married Dorothy Louise Aziz. They raised two children. He died in 1989.

Politics
Price was elected in the general election in 1955 and he was re-elected in the general elections in 1959, 1963 and 1967. During his time in office, he served on a large number of Standing Committees, though he did not serve in Cabinet.

References

External links 
 

1989 deaths
1919 births
Progressive Conservative Party of Ontario MPPs